The 1968 Isle of Man TT, the third round of the 1968 Grand Prix motorcycle racing season, involved six championship races on the Mountain Course on the Isle of Man during 8–14 June 1968. Giacomo Agostini won both the Junior and Senior races, completing the six laps of the latter race in 2 hours, 13 minutes and 39.4 seconds to win by almost nine minutes The Ultra-Lightweight 50cc race was won by Barry Smith, the Lightweight 125cc race by Phil Read and the Lightweight 250cc by Bill Ivy.

FIM Championship races

Ultra-Lightweight TT 50cc final standings
10 June 1968 – 3 Laps (113.00 Miles) Mountain Course.

Lightweight TT 125cc final standings
14 June 1968 – 3 Laps (113.00 Miles) Mountain Course.

Lightweight TT 250cc final standings
10 June 1968 – 6 Laps (226.38 Miles) Mountain Course.

Junior TT 350cc final standings
12 June 1968 – 6 Laps (236.38 Miles) Mountain Course.

Sidecar TT 500cc final standings
8 June 1968 – 3 Laps (113.2 Miles) Mountain Course.

Senior TT 500cc final standings
14 June 1968 – 6 Laps (236.38 Miles) Mountain Course.

Non-championship races

Sidecar 750cc TT final standings
8 June 1968 – 3 Laps (113.00 Miles) Mountain Course.

Production TT 750 cc final standings
12 June 1968 – 3 Laps (113.00 Miles) Mountain Course.

Production TT 500 cc final standings
12 June 1968 – 3 Laps (113.00 Miles) Mountain Course.

Production TT 250 cc final standings
12 June 1968 – 3 Laps (113.00 Miles) Mountain Course.

References

External links
 Detailed race results
 Mountain Course map

Isle of Man Tt
Tourist Trophy
Isle of Man TT
Isle of Man TT
Isle of Man